Protram Remonty i Modernizacja Tramwajów Protram Wrocław Sp. z o.o. Polish company that specializes in producing and modernizing trams. The company was created in 1999 in Wroclaw after the conversion of the MPK Wroclaw tram-repair facility into a private company. The company filed for bankruptcy in 2016 and was eventually liquidated.

Products 
There are 3 models of trams constructed by Protram:
204 WrAs
205 WrAs
206 WrAs - In project phase

The company does the modernization of the tram Konstal 105Na into Konstal 105NWr as well.

References

External links
Protram webside

Companies based in Wrocław
Polish companies established in 1999
Tram vehicles of Poland
Transport companies of Poland
Polish brands